The Caisse de garantie et d'amortissement (literally the Guarantees and Amortization Fund) was a French financial institution set up by the French Consulate in 1800 to spread the national debt. Re-formed several times between 1804 and 1811, it was finally liquidated in 1816 and replaced by the Caisse des dépôts et consignations.

Sources
« Bulletin des Lois de la République », n° 1, p. 8-9. In : Bulletin des Lois de la République Française, 3e série, tome 1 : Contenant les Lois et Arrêtés rendus depuis le mois de Nivôse jusqu'au dernier jour Complémentaire an VIII, Paris, Imprimerie de la République, an IX (1800).

Defunct banks of France
Government of France
1800 establishments in France
1816 disestablishments in France